The Eye of Vichy is a 1993 French documentary film directed by Claude Chabrol. It consists of a selection in chronological order of authentic footage, mostly newsreels and documentaries, shown on cinema screens in France between 1940 and 1944. Intertitles or a narrator occasionally add linking or supplementary information. The bulk of the material was produced under the Vichy régime and the aim of the film is to show the worldview which the collaborationist government of Pétain promoted to its population.

Themes
The main messages conveyed by this Vichy propaganda were:

That the elderly Pétain was a father to his people, incarnating the true France and heading its legitimate government. The unnamed de Gaulle was therefore a traitor and his pretensions to lead an alternative government false.
That the destiny of France lay in co-operation with the German occupiers to build a new Europe which excluded Britain and the USA to the west and the USSR to the east.
That collaboration with Nazi Germany included supplying workers of both sexes to its factories and sending soldiers to fight communism on the Eastern Front.
That the German armed forces were France's protectors against the Western Allies, who only brought destruction by bombing and invasion. Coverage of Anglo-American attacks emphasised the civilians killed and dwellings demolished.
That after resounding victories at El Alamein and Stalingrad, the invincible German forces made strategic withdrawals from North Africa and Russia.
That those who actively resisted the security forces of Vichy and the German occupiers were terrorists to be exterminated and that for every German killed innocent hostages would be shot.
That Jews were aliens and enemies, to be rounded up and deported. Their grim fate once transported east was not explained.

Critical reception
From Vincent Canby of The New York Times:

From TV Guide:

See also
Vichy France

References

External links 

1993 films
1993 documentary films
Documentary films about the Holocaust
Films directed by Claude Chabrol
Documentary films about Vichy France
French documentary films
Documentary films about films
Films about propaganda
1990s French films